The Tony Randall Show is an American television sitcom that aired on ABC during its first season from September 23, 1976, to March 10, 1977, and on CBS for its second (and final) season from September 24, 1977, to March 25, 1978.

Synopsis
The series starred Tony Randall as Walter Franklin, a middle-aged widowed judge, and took place in Philadelphia.  The show followed the reserved Franklin dealing with being a single parent, raising his teenage daughter, Roberta (Devon Scott) and preteen son, Oliver (Brad Savage). At times he also had to play surrogate parent to his daffy English housekeeper (Rachel Roberts), whose inedible cooking was a frequent source of humor. At work, Judge Franklin had to contend with his stuffy and acerbic secretary, Miss Janet Reubner (Allyn Ann McLerie), and his court reporter, Jack Terwilliger (Barney Martin), as well as presiding over court cases. Actor Zane Lasky played the recurring role of Mario Lanza, an annoying, nerdy, overbearing assistant who irritated Judge Franklin, but who kept getting rehired by Miss Reubner. Another recurring role was played by Diana Muldaur, who appeared as Judge Franklin's love interest, Judge Eleanor Hooper. Annette O'Toole played the role of Melissa (Oliver's teacher, to whom Walter was attracted) in two episodes, one in each season. In the show's second season, Devon Scott was replaced in the role of Roberta by Penny Peyser, and Hans Conried joined the cast in the occasional recurring role of Walter's irascible father Wyatt.  Towards the very end of the series run, Walter began teaching a night class in law; Michael Keaton was seen as Zeke Zacharias, one of Water's students, in two late-running episodes.

The show was produced by MTM Enterprises and aired for one season on ABC. For its second season, the series moved to CBS where it aired for one more season before being canceled. Writer/producer Gary David Goldberg discusses behind-the-scenes stories in his autobiography, Sit, Ubu, Sit.

Episodes

Series overview

Season 1 (1976–77)

Season 2 (1977–78)

Award nominations

References

External links

 

1976 American television series debuts
1978 American television series endings
1970s American legal television series
1970s American workplace comedy television series
1970s American sitcoms
American Broadcasting Company original programming
CBS original programming
Television series about families
Television series by MTM Enterprises
Television shows set in Philadelphia
Television series created by Tom Patchett